Nils Waltersen Aasen (30 March 1878 – 27 December 1925) was a Norwegian arms inventor. He has been credited with having developed the modern hand grenade and land mine just prior to World War I.

Biography
Aasen was born at Stadsbygd in Rissa, Norway. He graduated in 1903 from the Fortress-Artillery School for Non-Commissioned Officers at Oscarsborg Fortress. He started his experiments developing a hand grenade while serving as a sergeant at Oscarsborg. He was encouraged in his work by base commander and former defense minister Hans Georg Stang. However, the Norwegian Department of Defense showed little interest in Aasen's prototype. He then formed Aasen's Grenade Company (Det Aasenske Granatkompani) in Copenhagen, Denmark, which produced and exported of his grenade throughout Europe. Apart from new types of explosives, trench mortars, airplane bombs and land mines he also created several inventions for civil use. However, it was the development and production of arms that would bring him his greatest success.

Just prior to World War I, Aasen developed an anti-personnel mine which was meant as a weapon of deterrence. The invention caused enthusiasm within the French military but did not see production before the war. During World War I, Aasen was given the task of producing hand grenades for the French Army. He would have 13 factories with 13,000 employees working throughout the war.
In 1917 his hand grenade was finally adopted by the Norwegian army, which later promoted him to premier-lieutenant (Løytnant).

Throughout his life he received a number of honorary degrees and awards  for his inventions. Most notably, he was made an honorary colonel in the French Army, and a Knight in France's Legion of Honour in 1915. Later, Aasen's personal fortune was greatly reduced as a result of bad financial speculations, and because he had never patented the rights to several of his inventions. He died from tuberculosis in Stoughton, Wisconsin  at the age of 47.

Inventions
Aasen bomb
Aasen mortar

References

See also

 Legion of Honour
 List of Legion of Honour recipients by name (A)
 List of foreign recipients of the Legion of Honour by country
 Legion of Honour Museum

1878 births
1925 deaths
People from Rissa, Norway
Norwegian inventors
Chevaliers of the Légion d'honneur
20th-century deaths from tuberculosis
Norwegian Army personnel
Tuberculosis deaths in Wisconsin
Norwegian people of World War I
Norwegian company founders
Arms traders